Phillip D. Zamore is an American molecular biologist and developed the first in vitro system for studying the mechanism of RNA interference (RNAi). He is the Gretchen Stone Cook Professor of Biomedical Sciences and Professor of Biochemistry and Molecular Pharmacology at University of Massachusetts Chan Medical School, located in Worcester, Massachusetts. Zamore is the chair of the RNA Therapeutics Institute (RTI) at UMass Medical School, established in 2009, and has been a Howard Hughes Medical Institute Investigator since 2008.

Research 
The Zamore lab at the RTI focuses on understanding the underlying processes of RNAi; how small RNAs (miRNA, siRNA, piRNA) are involved in gene regulation networks. In addition to a focus on basic research, the Zamore lab is working to develop novel nucleic acid-based drugs to treat human disease. Dr. Zamore has more than 60,000 citations on Google Scholar.

Biography 
Zamore received his A.B. in biochemistry and molecular biology from Harvard University in Cambridge, Massachusetts, in 1986 and continued graduate studies with Michael Green at Harvard, receiving his Ph.D. in 1992. After completing postdoctoral studies at The Whitehead Institute for Biomedical Research at MIT and the Skirball Institute at New York University Medical Center with Ruth Lehmann, David Bartel, and James R. Williamson, Zamore began his academic career as an assistant professor in the Department of Biochemistry and Molecular Pharmacology in 1999 at UMass Medical School in Worcester, Massachusetts, where he is now the Gretchen Stone Cook Professor of Biomedical Sciences and Professor of Biochemistry and Molecular Pharmacology.

Involvement with biotechnology 
Zamore's research has led to a career in biotechnology, co-founding Alnylam Pharmaceuticals in 2002. Alnylam is dedicated to bringing RNAi based therapies to market and developed the first-ever FDA approved RNAi drug, Patisiran, gaining FDA approval in August 2018.  In 2014, Dr. Zamore co-founded another RNAi based company; Voyager Therapeutics, which focuses on developing therapeutics for neurodegenerative disorders.

Selected awards and honors 

Invented Here! Honoree, Boston Patent Law Association, for US patent US 9,226,976, “RAAV- Based Compositions and Methods for Treating Alpha-1 Anti-Trypsin Deficiencies,” October 2017
 Paper of the Year (Salomon et al., Cell 2015), Oligonucleotide Therapeutics Society
 Recipient, Chancellor's Medal for Excellence in Scholarship, University of Massachusetts Medical School
“The World’s Most Influential Scientific Minds 2014,” Molecular Biology & Genetics, Thomson-Reuters
 Top 20 Translational Researchers of 2014, Nature Biotechnology
 Fellow, National Academy of Inventors, December 2014
 Outstanding Research Achievement, Nature Biotechnology SciCafé June 2009
 Schering-Plough Award, American Society of Biochemistry and Molecular Biology, April 2009
 Most Highly Cited Researchers, 2002–2012 (Thomson-Reuters)
W.M. Keck Foundation Young Scholar in Medical Research, July 2002–July 2007
Top 20 Most Highly Cited Researchers in Molecular Biology and Genetics, 2002–2006, ScienceWatch (Thomson Scientific)
Pew Scholar in the Biomedical Sciences, July 2000–June 2004

Selected publications

References

American molecular biologists
Living people
University of Massachusetts Medical School faculty
Harvard College alumni
Year of birth missing (living people)
Harvard Graduate School of Arts and Sciences alumni